Punia is a genus of cicadas in the family Cicadidae endemic to Australia. Members of the genus are called grass pygmies. There are currently five described species in Punia. They are found in Western Australia, the Northern Territory and Queensland. The genus was considered to be a monotypic genus only containing P. minima until the 2020 description of four congeners.

Species 
Punia contains five species:

 Punia hyas 
 Punia kolos 
 Punia limpida 
 Punia minima 
 Punia queenslandica

References

Further reading

 

Cicadettini
Cicadidae genera